Gregory Brooks is an entrepreneur and former professional poker player. He began his poker career as an online player on sites such as PokerStars and then moved to no limit tournaments where he won the 2011 World Poker Tour L.A. Poker Classic, defeating Vivek Rajkumar for a prize of $1,654,120. Brooks is the co-founder of Skorb, a venture that he began with his brother in 2011. He is also the founder of LeggoPoker, a community-based website for teaching poker strategy through videos and one-on-one training. The company was purchased by Phil Ivey's IveyPoker in 2013. Brooks also founded the website Textbook Assault which aggregates pricing of textbooks from multiple websites such as Amazon.com, Chegg.com, Barnes and Noble, and eCampus.com.

Poker career

Brooks began his poker career at Party Poker, playing cash games while he was still attending Wake Forest University. As a freshman, he earned $25,000 over the summer of 2006 playing $1/$2 no limit hold'em and began to rise through the ranks of the online poker world. By the fall of 2007, Brooks was playing the largest stakes offered on PokerStars, and in the summer of 2008 released a montage video featuring various hands at stakes up to $50/$100 no limit hold'em. In the spring of 2011, Brooks began playing high-stakes poker in no-limit hold 'em tournaments. In addition to his earnings in no limit tournaments, Brooks is still active in online high-stakes poker tournaments.

Brooks' biggest victory came at the World Poker Tour 2011 L.A. Poker Classic where he took 1st place and a purse of $1,654,120.

Prize events

Business ventures

Brooks co-founded LeggoPoker, an online community that offers one-on-one training and instructional videos for poker players. The company was founded by Brooks and Chris Tickner and offers training from professional poker players such as Brooks, Andrew Lichtenberger, Aaron Jones, and Ben Sulsky (Sauce123). The company was purchased by Phil Ivey in 2013 as an addition to his Ivey League and currently operates as a division of IveyPoker.

In 2011, Brooks co-founded Skorb, an online portal that provides ways for college students to spend less on the things they buy. The website is only open to students and leverages discounts offered through  partners such as percentage savings at sites like Apple, Microsoft, Best Buy, and Groupon. The site also allows students to earn money by involving parents and other supporting individuals.

Brooks also co-founded the online metasearch engine Textbook Assault. The website compares textbook prices from multiple sources such as Amazon.com, Bookbyte, Biblio.com, and ECampus.com. The result of each search displays the website a book can be found and the price that it is selling for on that site, but also allows users to check out directly from the Textbook Assault site.

In 2022, Brooks purchased his first pair of Birkenstocks. They were the Milano in Brown Amalfi Leather from the Designer Shoe Warehouse.

See also

 Poker tournament
 World Series of Poker
 World Poker Tour season 9 results

References

Living people
Wake Forest University alumni
Year of birth missing (living people)
American poker players